Marley Redfern (born 13 December 2002) is a Scottish professional footballer who plays for Hamilton Academical, as a midfielder.

Career
Redfern began his career with Hamilton Academical, spending time on loan at Blackburn United in 2020. He signed a new contract with the Accies  in March 2021, and made his senior debut for the club two months later, on 16 May 2021.

References

2002 births
Living people
Sportspeople from Wishaw
People educated at Braidhurst High School
Scottish footballers
Hamilton Academical F.C. players
Blackburn United F.C. players
Scottish Professional Football League players
Association football midfielders
Footballers from North Lanarkshire